David Corbett is the name of:

David Corbett (lawyer), Canadian lawyer
David Corbett (footballer, born 1910), Scottish professional footballer
David Corbett (footballer, born 1940), English professional footballer